Philippe Arlaud, born in Paris, is a French stage director for plays, show, musical and opera, and is also a stage designer and light designer.

Selected productions as director 
1995 The Turn of the Screw, Wiener Kammeroper
1998 Nacht by Georg Friedrich Haas (premiere), Bregenzer Festspiele
1998 Die Frau ohne Schatten, Deutsche Oper Berlin
2002 Tannhäuser, Bayreuth Festival
2009 Les mamelles de Tirésias, 
2010 L'histoire du soldat, Feldkirchfestival
2010 Carmen, Festspielhaus Baden-Baden
2012 Ariadne auf Naxos, Festspielhaus Baden-Baden
2012 Fröken Julie by Ilkka Kuusisto, Feldkirchfestival

Awards 
1995  for stage design, for Angels in America and In den Augen eines Fremden (Schauspielhaus Wien)
1996 Kainz-Medaille, for Quai West (Schauspielhaus Wien)

External links 
 
 Philippe Arlaud Operabase

French theatre directors
French scenic designers
Lighting designers
Year of birth missing (living people)
Living people